KITSAT-3 was a South Korean remote sensing minisatellite which carried MEIS (Multispectral Earth Imaging System) and SENSE (Space ENvironment Scientific Experiment) instruments to low Earth orbit (LEO). Launched on 26 May 1999 by Indian space agency Indian Space Research Organisation (ISRO), on orbit the satellite was renamed to Uribyol-3. Manufactured by KAIST Satellite Technology Research Center (SaTReC), KITSAT-3 was developed with experience from KITSAT-1 and KITSAT-2 (no heritage to the KITSAT-1 and KITSAT-2 bus) and was the first independently designed South Korean satellite.

Launch 
Kitsat-3 was launched in the PSLV-C2 mission by 26 May 1999 by Indian space agency ISRO at 06:22 UTC from Satish Dhawan Space Centre in India. The launch was the first commercial launch by ISRO of its launch vehicle (PSLV-C2) and US$1.0 million (equivalent to US$ million in ) was charged by the Indian agency for launching and injecting the satellite in the low Earth orbit.

Mission highlights 
 First independently designed South Korean satellite
 First commercial flight of the launch vehicle, Polar Satellite Launch Vehicle (PSLV)
 Spacecraft attitude was first captured and 3-axis stabilized on 30 May 1999
 First image obtained on 31 May 1999
 Solar panels deployed on 24 June 1999
 Design for life of 3 years
 However, operations ended in December 2003 (4.5 years achieved)

See also 
 KITSAT-1
 PSLV-C2

References 

Satellites orbiting Earth
Satellites of South Korea
Spacecraft launched in 1999
Amateur radio satellites